Épineuil-le-Fleuriel is a commune in the Cher department in the Centre-Val de Loire region of France.

Geography
The A71 autoroute runs through the western part of the territory of the commune and it shares a border with the department of Allier.

Population

Sights
 St Martin's church, dating from the twelfth century.
 The eighteenth-century chateau of Cornançay.
 The nineteenth-century school and museum of writer Alain-Fournier.
 A feudal motte with a moat.
 Traces of another medieval castle.
 The chateau of Fougerolles.
 Old tile works at la Bouchatte.
 A washhouse at Cornançay.

Personalities
 Alain-Fournier, writer, spent his childhood here, where his parents taught at the school. The setting of his novel, Le Grand Meaulnes, is based on the area around the village.

See also
Communes of the Cher department

References

External links

Annuaire Mairie website 

Communes of Cher (department)